The Stade de la Colombière is a football stadium in Épinal, eastern France. 

It is the home of French Championnat de France Amateurs side SAS Épinal. The capacity of the stadium is around 8,000 supporters.

Athletics (track and field) venues in France
Football venues in France
SAS Épinal
Sports venues in Vosges (department)